Charlie Waller may refer to :

 Charlie Waller (American football) (1921–2009), American football coach
 Charlie Waller (American musician) (1935–2004), American bluegrass musician
 Charlie Waller (British musician) (born 1980), British rock musician